Anusree Roy is a Canadian award-winning writer of plays, television, film and libretto. She is also an actress.

Education 
Roy was born in Kolkata, India and holds a B.A in theatre from York University and an M.A from the University of Toronto. Roy emigrated to Canada with her family at age 17.

Television work 

She played Nurse Patel on the TV show Remedy in 2014 and 2015. She was a story editor for Remedy in its first season. She was an Executive Story Editor, on  season 5 of CTV/SyFy's Killjoys. She has been an Executive Story Editor and Consulting Producer on Nurses, season one and two respectively on NBC/GlobalTV. She has been the Consulting Producer of Transplant on NBC/CTV.

Theatre work 

She premiered her first piece, breathlessness, in 2006. Her play Pyaasa debuted at Theatre Passe Muraille in 2007, and won two Dora Mavor Moore Awards in the independent theatre division in 2008, including Outstanding New Play and Outstanding Performance (Female). Her subsequent plays have included Letters to My Grandma, Roshni and Brothel #9. Brothel #9 won the Carol Bolt Award and the Dora Mavor Moore Award for Outstanding New Play in 2011, and was a nominee for the Governor General's Award for English-language drama at the 2012 Governor General's Awards. She has also won the RBC Emerging Artist Award, the K. M. Hunter Award and the Siminovitch Protege Prize. Trident Moon, premiered at London, England's Finborough Theatre and was a 2017-2018 Susan Smith Blackburn finalist.  Her subsequent play Little Pretty & The Exceptional premiered at Factory Theatre in 2017 and was nominated for two Dora Mavor Moore awards, under the acting category.  Her audio play Sisters premiered online at Apple Podcast and Spotify on March 20, 2021.  She has premiered two operas, Noor over Afghan and The Golden Boy.

She has been playwright-in-residence at the Canadian Stage, Theatre Passe Muraille, Nightwood Theatre, Factory Theatre and the Blyth Festival, and is co-artistic director with David DeGrow and Thomas Morgan Jones of Theatre Jones Roy.

Play summaries 

Brothel # 9 - Rekha, a young South Asian village woman, travels to Calcutta to take an honest job, only to discover she has been sold into a brothel.  There she meets Jamuna, the jaded madam, who believes there's no escape from the confines of their trade.  Strong-willed and determined to defy fate, Rekha realizes she can shape her own destiny and discovers compassion, faith and forgiveness are the foundation of true liberty.
Letters to My Grandma - Malobee unearths letters detailing her grandmother's fight to survive the 1947 partition of India, which resonates with Malobee's own struggles to create a new life in present-day Toronto.
Pyaasa - Set in Calcutta, Pyaasa tells the story of Chaya, an eleven-year-old untouchable who dreams of nothing more than learning her times tables. When Chaya's mother begs a woman from a higher caste to give Chaya a job at a local tea stall, Chaya's journey from childhood to adulthood begins and ends over ten days.
Little Pretty and The Exceptional - a family drama involving two sisters and their father preparing to open their new sari shop in Toronto's Little India neighbourhood.
Trident Moon - India, 1947. Six women, three Muslim and three Hindu, hide inside a coal truck as it speeds through the newly divided Hindustan. Nothing will prevent Alia getting to West Bengal. Her former employers are now her captives and she will have revenge for what they have done, even if she has to harm the child she has spent her life raising. Violence and hatred threaten to engulf those inside the truck, as thick and terrifying as that which can be heard outside in the streets. But suddenly the truck stops, and the women must find what unites them in order to have any chance of survival...
Sisters - Millie and Rai, who have recently immigrated to Toronto from India with their father. Set over the course of one evening at Tatos Laundromat in New Toronto, the sisters fantasize about: what they will order at Tim Hortons, getting a cell phone, and how exciting their new life will be – as soon as their dad lands his first job. Their daydreaming is cut short when an event occurs at the laundromat, threatening not only their sense of security, but their ability to withhold secrets from each other.

Awards 

 Dora Mavor Moore Award	     Outstanding New Play for Pyaasa	                                (2008)	
 Dora Mavor Moore Award	     Outstanding Performance by a Female for Pyaasa 	        (2008)	
 RBC Emerging Artist Award	     Theatre	                                                                        (2009)	
 Dora Mavor Moore Award	     Outstanding New Play for Brothel # 9	                        (2011)	
 K. M Hunter Artist Award	     Theatre	                                                                        (2011)	
 Dora Mavor Moore Award           Outstanding New Play	(Brothel # 9)	                        (2011)
 Carol Bolt Award for Playwriting  Brothel # 9                                                                          (2011)	     
 Governor General's Award.	     Theatre (Brothel # 9)	(Nominated)                                                        (2013)	      
 Siminovitch Protege Prize	     Theatre (Brothel # 9)                                                            (2012)
 Dora Mavor Moore Award            Outstanding New Play (Sultans of the Street)                     (2014)              
 Dora Mavor Moore Award            Outstanding Ensemble (Sultans of the Street)                     (2014)   
 Dora Mavor Moore Award           Outstanding Direction (Sultans of the Street)                       (2014)   
 Dora Mavor Moore Award           Outstanding Production (Sultans of the Street)                    (2014)
 Susan Smith Blackburn Award (finalist)         Play (Trident Moon)                    (2017-2018)

References

Canadian stage actresses
Canadian women dramatists and playwrights
Indian stage actresses
Indian women dramatists and playwrights
Actresses from Toronto
Writers from Toronto
Writers from Kolkata
Indian emigrants to Canada
York University alumni
University of Toronto alumni
Dora Mavor Moore Award winners
Living people
Canadian writers of Asian descent
Canadian people of Bengali descent
Canadian actresses of Indian descent
1982 births
21st-century Canadian dramatists and playwrights
21st-century Indian women writers
21st-century Indian dramatists and playwrights
Women writers from West Bengal
Dramatists and playwrights from West Bengal
Bengali Hindus
20th-century Bengalis
21st-century Bengalis
Bengali writers
Bengali actresses